The Jolson Story is a 1946 American biographical musical film, a fictionalized account of the life of singer Al Jolson. It stars Larry Parks as Jolson, Evelyn Keyes as Julie Benson (approximating Jolson's wife, Ruby Keeler), William Demarest as his manager, Ludwig Donath and Tamara Shayne as his parents, and Scotty Beckett as the young Jolson. Many of the film's episodes are based on fact but the story is simplified, with some people disguised or combined into single characters.

The Columbia Pictures production was written by Sidney Buchman (uncredited), Harry Chandlee, Stephen Longstreet, and Andrew Solt. The dramatic scenes were directed by Alfred E. Green, with the musical sequences directed by Joseph H. Lewis.

Plot
Stage-struck Asa Yoelson wants to sing in burlesque performer Steve Martin's act. Cantor Yoelson, his father, refuses to consider it. After Asa runs away but is found in Baltimore, the Yoelsons grudgingly consent. Martin gives him billing, under a new name: Al Jolson. Jolson receives a job offer from minstrel-show master Lew Dockstader, and Martin releases Jolson.

Al succeeds with the minstrel troupe and is invited to join a Broadway show (thanks to Martin, behind the scenes). Al becomes the leading player and takes the show on tour. Al hires his old mentor Martin, now unemployed, to be his manager. (In real life there was no "Steve Martin"; the character is a composite of Jolson's three managers.)

Al, always too busy for girls, meets up-and-coming dancer Julie Benson. It is love at first sight for Al, who proposes to her that night. (Al Jolson was actually married four times. The character Julie Benson is modeled on his third wife, Ruby Keeler.) Al will not take no for an answer, and they marry. Al electrifies the show world with his first feature film, The Jazz Singer, and eagerly signs for more movies. His wife wants to quit show business and settle down, but Al persuades her to continue with her career. Julie becomes a movie star, but can't stand any more of Al's nonstop, show-biz lifestyle. Al realizes that the only way to keep Julie is to quit show business.

Al refuses all job offers and absolutely will not sing, even for family and friends. Papa Yoelson persuades his son to join him in a songthe music he and Mama Yoelson danced to at their weddingand Al gets caught up in it. They adjourn to a nightclub, where the audience demands a song. Al agrees to a single number but the crowd yells for more. Julie, seeing Al happier than he's been in years, leaves while he's performing. She walks out of the nightclub and out of his life, leaving Al to his first love: singing.

Cast
 Larry Parks as Al Jolson
 Evelyn Keyes as Julie Benson
 William Demarest as Steve Martin
 Bill Goodwin as Tom Baron
 Ludwig Donath as Cantor Yoelson
 Scotty Beckett as Asa Yoelson/Al Jolson, as a boy
 Tamara Shayne as Mrs. Yoelson
 Jo-Carroll Dennison as Ann Murray
 John Alexander as Lew Dockstader
 Edwin Maxwell as Oscar Hammerstein
 Ernest Cossart as Father McGee
 Harry Shannon as Officer Reilly
 Robert Mitchell Boys' Choir as the church choir (as Mitchell 'Boychoir')
 Rudy Wissler (soundtrack only) as singing voice for Scotty Beckett
 William Forrest as Dick Glenn, movie producer
 Eddie Kane as Florenz Ziegfeld
 Buddy Gorman as Jimmy, theater call boy
 Eric Wilton as Henry, the Jolsons' butler

Plot accuracy
Some of the plot details were fictionalized. There is no evidence that Jolson ever appeared as a child singer, and he was brought up by his sister, not his mother (who had died). Jolson actually had three managers, who were combined into the William Demarest character "Steve Martin". Ruby Keeler refused to allow her name to be used, so the writers used an alias, "Julie Benson".

Production
Larry Parks' vocals were recorded by Al Jolson; Scotty Beckett's songs were recorded by Rudy Wissler. Al Jolson, determined to appear on screen somehow, persuaded the producer to film him instead of Larry Parks for the blackface "Swanee" number. Jolson is seen entirely in long shot; he performs on a theater runway.

Filming was already under way as a black-and-white feature when studio chief Harry Cohn, encouraged by the scenes already filmed, decided to start the project all over as a Technicolor production. Cohn was impressed by director Joseph H. Lewis's handling of the musical numbers in the 1944 PRC feature Minstrel Man, and hired Lewis to stage the musical sequences for the Jolson project.

Jolson had a 50% share of the profits.

Reception
The film was a tremendous financial success, and won Academy Awards for Best Music, Scoring of a Musical Picture (Morris Stoloff), and Best Sound Recording (John Livadary). It was nominated for Best Actor in a Leading Role (Larry Parks), Best Actor in a Supporting Role (William Demarest), Best Cinematography, Color (Joseph Walker) and Best Film Editing (William A. Lyon). The film was also entered into the 1947 Cannes Film Festival.

Larry Parks became a full-fledged star in major productions. His sudden rise to prominence was considered an "overnight success," though he had been featured in Columbia's low-budget features for five years. Parks continued playing character leads, but was most associated with his interpretation of Jolson. Columbia cast him in a successful sequel, Jolson Sings Again (1949).

The film is recognized by the American Film Institute in these lists:
 2006: AFI's Greatest Movie Musicals – Nominated

Radio adaptation 
Lux Radio Theatre presented The Jolson Story on February 16, 1948. Jolson starred as himself in the one-hour adaptation. Jolson also starred in a Lux adaptation of his first feature The Jazz Singer, supported by Jolson Story actors Ludwig Donath and Tamara Shayne.

Quotations
 "I heard some music tonight. Something they call 'jazz.' The fellows just make it up as they go along. They pick it out of the air." (Jolson to Dockstader)
 "[I'm] trying to make songs out of music I picked up. Music nobody ever heard of before, but the only kind I want to sing." (Jolson, explaining what he's been doing)
 "That's an audience that never saw a live show. People in small towns who can afford a movie, where they can't afford anything else. Audience of millions. I'd be singing to every one of them at the same time. That's really something!" (Jolson, discussing the new talking picture)
 "Tonight, folks, I'm only going to sing two thousand songs. One to a customer." (Jolson)
 "Broadway? What a street! You know something, baby? It belongs to me. You know something else? If you want, I'll give it to you." (Jolson)

Songs in the film 

"Let Me Sing and I'm Happy"
"On the Banks of the Wabash"
"Ave Maria"
"When You Were Sweet Sixteen"
"After the Ball"
"By the Light of the Silvery Moon"
"Blue Bell"
"Ma Blushin' Rosie"
"I Want a Girl"
"My Mammy"
"I'm Sitting on Top of the World"
"You Made Me Love You"
"Swanee"

"Toot, Toot, Tootsie! (Goo' Bye)"
"The Spaniard That Blighted My Life"
"April Showers"
"California, Here I Come"
"Liza (All the Clouds'll Roll Away)"
"There's a Rainbow 'Round My Shoulder"
"Avalon"
"She's a Latin from Manhattan"
"About a Quarter to Nine"
"Anniversary Song"
"Waiting for the Robert E. Lee"
"Rock-a-Bye Your Baby with a Dixie Melody"

References

External links

 
 
 
 
 Photos of Evelyn Keyes in 'The Jolson Story' by Ned Scott

1946 films
1946 musical films
1940s biographical films
American musical films
American biographical films
Biographical films about entertainers
Biographical films about singers
Blackface minstrel shows and films
Columbia Pictures films
1940s English-language films
Films about musical theatre
Films directed by Alfred E. Green
Films that won the Best Original Score Academy Award
Films that won the Best Sound Mixing Academy Award
Jukebox musical films
Musical films based on actual events
Films with screenplays by Sidney Buchman
Films scored by Morris Stoloff
Cultural depictions of Al Jolson
Photoplay Awards film of the year winners
1940s American films